The Delta Dental Plans Association is an American network of dental insurance companies composed of 39 independent Delta Dental members operating in all 50 states, the District of Columbia and Puerto Rico. These member companies provide coverage to 85 million people, enrolled in over 157,000 groups.  While many of the Delta Dental member companies and Delta Dental Plans Association (DDPA) are non-profit organizations, a few of the member companies have for-profit segments.

Delta Dental member companies serve more than one third of the estimated 166 million Americans with dental insurance.

History
Delta Dental's roots go back to 1954 with the formation of dental service corporations in California, Oregon, and Washington, which were created by dentists who recognized the need to increase access to oral health care. Led by Washington Dental Service (WDS), Delta Dental began by providing dental benefit programs for organized labor unions and later underprivileged residents through a partnership with the Washington State Department of Public Assistance. WDS was rebranded in 2013 as Delta Dental of Washington.

Delta Dental Plans Association (DDPA) was created in 1966 to bring together these local state service organizations and coordinate dental benefit programs for customers with employees in multiple states. A year later, the first multi-state program was sold by WDS to the International Association of Machinists. WDS ceded the administration for enrollees in other states to other Delta Dental member companies and contracted with the Blue Cross and Blue Shield Association for administration in those states without a Delta Dental affiliate organization.

Coverage was provided this way until the late 1980s when Delta Dental of California won the bid for the Office of the Civilian Health and Medical Program of the Uniformed Services (OCHAMPUS) program. Delta Dental member companies agreed to share its provider data so the administration of this very large account could be centralized, with Delta Dental of California sharing the administrative income and risk. The OCHAMPUS program led to the creation of the National Provider File (NPF), which was made available for commercial accounts in 1990 via Delta USA – providing Delta Dental coverage to organizations with employees and subscribers located in multiple states.

Plan assignment
If individuals have dental insurance through their employer, the Delta Dental member company in the state of their headquarters usually will handle coverage. Individual Delta Dental insurance is available in several states either through that state's member company or the state or federal health care exchange. Other individual dental insurance options are available through specialty groups such as AARP and military retiree, federal employee and veterans' groups..

Vertical integration
Dental Service of Massachusetts, also known as Delta Dental of Massachusetts, illustrates vertical integration in the dental industry of Massachusetts, where beneficial ownership or control by one company of two or more stages of production or services normally operated by other companies. Some dental providers charge that this practice reduces insurance competition and dictates prices for clinical services. Delta Dental of Massachusetts and DentaQuest (a competitor) are subordinate companies of Dental Service of Massachusetts.

References

External links
 Delta Dental
 Delta Dental of Massachusetts
 Delta Dental Dentist Search

Health maintenance organizations
Financial services companies established in 1966
Health care companies established in 1966
Dental companies of the United States
1966 establishments in the United States